Dera Ghazi Khan is a city in Punjab, Pakistan.

Dera Ghazi Khan may also refer to:

Dera Ghazi Khan District, a district of Punjab (Pakistan)
Dera Ghazi Khan Tehsil, a tehsil of district Dera Ghazi Khan
Dera Ghazi Khan Division, an administrative unit of Punjab (Pakistan)
Dera Ghazi Khan International Airport, an airport situated in Punjab (Pakistan)
Dera Ghazi Khan railway station, a railway station in Punjab
Dera Ghazi Khan Medical College, a medical college

See also